Denver railway station may refer to:

 Union Station (Denver) in Colorado, United States
 Denver railway station (England), in Denver, Norfolk, United Kingdom